KVDG (90.9 FM) is a radio station broadcasting a religious format. Licensed to Midland, Texas, United States. The station is currently owned by the La Promesa Foundation.

History
The station was assigned call sign KAQQ on 1998-10-01.  On 2006-01-10, the station changed its call sign to KAQQ, again on 2008-01-10 to KLPF, and on 2008-01-31 to the current KVDG.

References

External links

VDG
VDG